The  is a major tributary of the Agano River in Japan. The river is located within Niigata, Gunma and Fukushima Prefectures.

Dams
Starting from the furthest upstream, the river is dammed by:

References

Rivers of Gunma Prefecture
Rivers of Fukushima Prefecture
Rivers of Niigata Prefecture
Rivers of Japan